Gena Lovett is the current Vice President of Operations for Boeing Defense, Space & Security.

Early life and education 
Gena Lovett was born in Cleveland, Ohio. Her father made dentures and her mother worked at a Ford Motor Company engine plant. She attended Captain Arthur Roth Elementary, Patrick Henry Middle School, and Shaw High School. She credits much of her early educational success to guidance and support by her parents and school guidance counselors.

Lovett attended Ohio State University for her undergraduate degree. Initially, she pursued chemical engineering, but later switched to pre-law studies, graduating in 1986. 
She then completed an MBA at Baker College in Michigan in 2001. She is currently pursuing a doctoral degree in Values Driven Leadership at Benedictine University.

Career 
Lovett has focused on manufacturing operations for the majority of her career. In 1992, she began her career as a plant manager for Ford in Avon Lake, Ohio, where she was the only female supervisor. She remained with Ford until 2007, when she moved to Alcoa. There, she served as the Director of Manufacturing for their Cleveland manufacturing campus. She was the first female and first person of color to hold this title since 1917. She was appointed Alcoa's Chief Diversity Officer from 2012-2015. Under her leadership, Alcoa won the 2013 Catalyst Award and the Human Rights Campaign’s 2014 Corporate Equality Award.

Since 2015, she has served as the Vice President of Operations for Boeing Defense, Space & Security. She is responsible for standardization, safety, production efficiency for military aircraft and land vehicles, rotorcraft, satellites, and weapons. She was listed in 50 Black Women Over 50.

In addition to her day-to-day job, Lovett serves as an advisor or Board of Director for Trex.

Personal life 
Lovett's other interests include creative writing, French, and making stained glass.

References 

African-American women in business
Living people
Year of birth missing (living people)
Ohio State University alumni
Businesspeople from Cleveland
21st-century African-American women
21st-century African-American people
21st-century American businesspeople
21st-century American businesswomen
20th-century African-American women
20th-century African-American people
20th-century American businesspeople
20th-century American businesswomen